Victor Louis Goines (born August 6, 1961) is a jazz saxophonist and clarinetist who has served as president and chief executive officer of Jazz St. Louis since September 2022. From 2000 to 2007, he was director of the jazz program at Juilliard.

Career 
Goines graduated from St. Augustine High School in New Orleans and has been a member of Jazz at Lincoln Center Orchestra and the Wynton Marsalis Septet since 1993. Goines served as the director of jazz studies and professor for the Bienen School of Music at Northwestern University from 2008 to 2022. He presently serves as President/CEO of Jazz St. Louis.

Goines has collaborated with Terence Blanchard, Dee Dee Bridgewater, Ruth Brown, Ray Charles, Bo Diddley, Bob Dylan, Dizzy Gillespie, Freddie Green, Lionel Hampton, Freddie Hubbard, B.B. King, Lenny Kravitz, Branford Marsalis, Ellis Marsalis, James Moody, Dianne Reeves, Marcus Roberts, Diana Ross, Eric Clapton, Wycliffe Gordon, and Stevie Wonder.

He has performed on more than 20 recordings, including the soundtracks for three Ken Burns documentaries and the films Undercover Blues (1993), Night Falls on Manhattan (1997), and Rosewood (1997). He has composed more than 200 original works, including Jazz at Lincoln Center and ASCAP commissions.

He has also served on the faculties of Florida A&M University, University of New Orleans, Loyola University of New Orleans, and Xavier University of Louisiana. Goines is an artist for Buffet Crampon and Vandoren.

Discography

As Leader 

 Genesis (AFO, 1992)
 "Joe's Blues" (Rosemary Joseph Records, 1998)
 "To Those We Love So Dearly" (Rosemary Joseph Records, 1999)
 Sunrise To Midnight (Rosemary Joseph Records, 2000)
 "New Adventures" (Criss Cross Records, 2006)
 "Love Dance" (Criss Cross Records, 2007)
 "Pastels in Ballads and Blues" (Rosemary Joseph Records, 2007)
 "Twilight" (Rosemary Joseph Records, 2012)
 "Morning Swing" (Rosemary Joseph Records, 2013)
 "A Dance At The Mardi Gras Ball" (Rosemary Joseph Records, 2016)

Collaborations 
"'with Janio Abreu'"

 Nuestra Herencia Musical (En Vivo) (2018)
 Juntos Otra Vez (En Vivo) (2020)
 Janio Abreu y Aire de Concierto, Victor Goines & Orquesta de Camara de la Habana  (En Vivo) (2022)

As Sideman 
With Wynton Marsalis Septet

 "In This House, On This Morning" (Columbia, 1994)
 "Joe Cool's Blues ("Columbia, 1995)
 "The Marciac Suite" (Columbia, 1999)
 "Standard Time, Vol. 4: Marsalis Plays Monk" (Columbia, 1999)
 "Standard Time Vol. 6:  Mr. Jelly Lord" (Columbia, 1999)
 "Reeltime" (Sony Classical, 1999)
 "Wynton Marsalis:  The London Concert" (Columbia, 2000)
 "Unforgiveable Blackness: The Rise and Fall of Jack Johnson" (Blue Note, 2004)
 "The War" (2007)

"'With The Jazz At Lincoln Center Orchestra'"

 Portraits by Ellington (Columbia, 1992)
 "The Fire of the Fundamentals" (Columbia, 1993)
 "They Came to Swing" (Columbia, 1994)
 "Blood on the Fields" (Columbia, 1997)
 "Jump Start and Jazz" (Columbia, 1997)
 "Live in Swing City" (Columbia, 1999)
 Sweet Release & Ghost Story (Columbia, 1999)
 "Big Train" (Columbia/Sony Classical, 1999)
 "All Rise" (Sony Classical, 2002)
 A Love Supreme (Palmetto Records, 2005)
 "Higher Ground: Hurricane Relief Benefit Concert" (Blue Note Records, 2005)                  
 "Don't Be Afraid…The Music of Charles Mingus "(Palmetto Records, 2005)""                                   
 Congo Square (Jazz at Lincoln Center, 2007)
 "Portraits in Seven Shades" (The Orchard, 2010)
 "Vitoria Suite" (EmArcy Records, 2010)
 "Live in Cuba" (Blue Engine Records, 2015)
 "Big Band Holidays (Blue Engine Records, 2015)"
 "The Abyssinian Mass" (Blue Engine Records, 2016)
 "The Music of John Lewis" (Blue Engine Records, 2017)
 "Handful of Keys" (Blue Engine Records, 2017)
"'With Ruth Brown'"

 "Fine and Mellow" (Fantasy Records, 1992)
 R + B = Ruth Brown (Bullseye Blues, 1997)
 "A Good Day for the Blues" (Bullseye Blues, 1999)

Notes

External links
 Jazz at Lincoln Center Bio
 Northwestern University Faculty Profile

1961 births
African-American saxophonists
Jazz musicians from New Orleans
American jazz saxophonists
American male saxophonists
American jazz clarinetists
Living people
20th-century American saxophonists
21st-century American saxophonists
Florida A&M University faculty
University of New Orleans faculty
Loyola University New Orleans faculty
Xavier University of Louisiana faculty
Northwestern University faculty
Juilliard School faculty
21st-century clarinetists
20th-century American male musicians
21st-century American male musicians
American male jazz musicians
Jazz at Lincoln Center Orchestra members
20th-century African-American musicians
21st-century African-American musicians
Criss Cross Jazz artists